Lyra is a lossy audio codec developed by Google that is designed for compressing speech at very low bitrates. Unlike most other audio formats, it compresses data using a machine learning-based algorithm.

Features 
The Lyra codec is designed to transmit speech in real-time when bandwidth is severely restricted, such as over slow or unreliable network connections. It runs at a fixed bitrate 3 kbps and it is intended to provide better quality than codecs that use traditional waveform-based algorithms at similar bitrates. Instead, compression is achieved via a machine learning algorithm that encodes the input with feature extraction, and then reconstructs an approximation of the original using a generative model. This model was trained on thousands of hours of speech recorded in over 70 languages to function with various speakers. Because generative models are more computationally complex than traditional codecs, a simple model that processes different frequency ranges in parallel is used to obtain acceptable performance. Lyra operates on frames of 40 ms and Google claims it can run with 90 ms of latency on typical hardware. Google's reference implementation is available for Android and Linux.

Quality 
Lyra performs significantly better than traditional codecs at similar bitrates. Ian Buckley at MakeUseOf says, "It succeeds in creating almost eerie levels of audio reproduction with bitrates as low as 3 kbps." Google claims that is reproduces natural-sounding speech, and that Lyra at 3 kbps beats Opus at 8kps. Tsahi Levent-Levi writes that Satin, Microsoft's AI-based codec, outperforms it at higher bitrates.

History 
Lyra was first announced in February 2021, and in April, Google released the source code of their reference implementation.

Support

Implementations 
Google's implementation is available on Github under the Apache License. Written in C++, it is optimized for 64-bit ARM but also runs on x86, on either Android or Linux.

Applications 
Google Duo uses Lyra to transmit sound for video chats when bandwidth is limited.

References

External links 

 Lyra: A New Very Low-Bitrate Codec for Speech Compression  Google blog post with a demonstration comparing codecs

See also 

 Satin (codec), an AI-based codec developed by Microsoft
 Comparison of audio coding formats
 Speech coding
 Videotelephony
Speech codecs
Lossy compression algorithms
Software using the Apache license
Google software
Machine learning
2021 software